Bhuapur is a town of Bhuapur Upazila, Tangail, Bangladesh. The town is situated 29 km north of Tangail city and 109 km northwest of Dhaka city, the capital of Bangladesh. The town consists of 9 wards and 19 Mahallas.

Demographics
According to Population Census 2011 performed by Bangladesh Bureau of Statistics, The total population of Bhuapur town is 28708. There are 6854 households in total.

Education
The literacy rate of Bhuapur town is 59% (Male-61.7%, Female-56.2%).

Institutes
 Ibrahim khan Govt. College
Founded by Ibrahim Khan, writer.
 Shahid Zia Mohila College
 Lokman Fokir Degree College
 Momtaz Fokir High School
 Bhuapur Pilot high School
 Bhuapur Pilot Girls High School
 Tepibari High school
 Bharoi high school

References

Populated places in Dhaka Division
Populated places in Tangail District
Pourashavas of Bangladesh